Tony Hill (born 30 April 1986) is a British former professional boxer who competed from 2009 to 2014, and challenged once for the Commonwealth middleweight title in 2012.

Professional career
Hill made his professional debut on 11 September 2009, scoring a first-round stoppage over Stuart Barr. On 28 April 2012, Hill fought Billy Joe Saunders for the vacant Commonwealth middleweight title, but was stopped in thirty seconds of the first round.

Professional boxing record

References

External links

Living people
1986 births
English male boxers
Middleweight boxers
Light-heavyweight boxers
Sportspeople from Southampton